João Justino Amaral dos Santos (born 25 December 1954 in Campinas, São Paulo State), best known as Amaral or Amaral II, is a Brazilian former footballer.

He played for Guarani (1971–1978), Corinthians (1978–1981), Santos (1981–1982), in Mexico with Leones Negros de la Universidad de Guadalajara (1981–1985), and close his career in 1987 with Blumenau.

He won one Campeonato Paulista (1979) and one Mexican First Division (1984).  He was capped 41 times by the Brazil national football team, from August 1975 to June 1980, and with them he won the Bicentennial Tournament in 1976 and participated in 7 games at the 1978 FIFA World Cup.

References

External links

1954 births
Living people
Brazil international footballers
Brazilian footballers
Brazilian expatriate footballers
Brazilian expatriate sportspeople in Mexico
Expatriate footballers in Mexico
Liga MX players
Club América footballers
Leones Negros UdeG footballers
1975 Copa América players
1978 FIFA World Cup players
1979 Copa América players
Guarani FC players
Santos FC players
Sport Club Corinthians Paulista players
Campeonato Brasileiro Série A players
Association football defenders
Sportspeople from Campinas